The following is a partial list of children’s museums in India.

See also
 Children's museum
 Science museum

Notes 

 
Children